Megalomma is a genus of beetles in the family Cicindelidae, containing the following species:

 Megalomma fulgens (W. Horn, 1892)
 Megalomma janaki Moravec, 2007
 Megalomma oculatum (Fabricius, 1798)
 Megalomma pierreorum Deuve, 2000
 Megalomma viridulum (Quesnel, 1806)

References

Cicindelidae